Kirsten Gronfield (born November 29, 1977) is an American improv comedy actress.

Career

Gronfield trained with the famed improv company Groundlings. She has worked with troupes such as Accelerator, Toby St. Claire’s Comedy Extravaganza, Secret Improv Society, Comic Sutra and Traveling Improv Troupe. Her film credits include lead roles in Steve Saves L.A., The Caller, Yours, Mine & Ours and The Battle and Other Shorts, as well as a supporting role in Wish You Were Here. Gronfield starred, as Ingrid Wakowski, in the TBS television series 10 Items or Less from 2006 to 2009.

References

External links

Living people
American women comedians
American film actresses
American television actresses
1977 births
People from Plymouth, Minnesota
21st-century American comedians
21st-century American actresses